Monika Smith is a Canadian actress, writer, and comedian from the Upright Citizens Brigade Theatre and The Second City in Los Angeles.

Career
Smith has been seen on Who Gets the Last Laugh?, as Kiki on Two and a Half Men, The Newsroom, Newsreaders, The Joe Schmo Show: The Full Bounty, Nick Swardson's Pretend Time, Disaster Date, Players, and in sketches on The Tonight Show with Conan O'Brien and Conan.

She has performed at Upright Citizens Brigade Theatre Los Angeles and UCBNY, The Second City Toronto Touring Company, and at The Second City L.A., Chicago Improv Festival, iO Chicago, iO West, Del Close Marathon, and more. Smith can be seen in UCB's Inside The Master Class, and is currently a member of Coming Clean and Rough Cut: The Improvised Movie.

References

External links
 Monika Smith at the Internet Movie Database

Canadian television actresses
Living people
Canadian women comedians
Year of birth missing (living people)